Hypogastric can refer to:
 The hypogastrium, a region of the abdomen
 The "hypogastric artery", an old name for the internal iliac artery
 The "hypogastric vein", an old name for the internal iliac vein
 The "hypogastric lymph nodes", also called the internal iliac lymph nodes
 The hypogastric nerve plexuses:
 superior hypogastric plexus
 inferior hypogastric plexus